New Guard is the eighteenth and final novel in the CHERUB series by Robert Muchamore, and the fifth and final book in the Aramov series. It was published on 31 May 2016.

Plot
Leon and Daniel Sharma, younger twin brothers of Ryan Sharma, ambush paedophile Nigel Kinney and hand over evidence of his activities to the PHN (Paedophile Hunting Network), a vigilante group. They are caught returning to CHERUB campus and are given two months of hard drill, an excruciating physical activity. Meanwhile, James Adams and sister Lauren arrive at campus for the demolition party celebrating the demolition of the main building. They help to clear archives in the basement first. Chairman Ewart Asker introduces the oldest surviving CHERUB agent and two red shirts who press the button to demolish the building. The main building is demolished and the new Campus Village is opened. 

Soon, the twins are pulled out of hard drill for a mission in Birmingham with James. Their task is to befriend Oliver Lakshmi, a troubled youth with a reputation for elaborate but untrue stories and see if he has information on radical Islamic terror groups or if he is lying. He is also a potential recruit for CHERUB. Oliver, known as Oli, turns out to be a bully and a thief and James decides he won't be recruited. However, Leon and Daniel learn of a local gangster, Trey, who is supervised by an elderly man known as Uncle. Ryan joins the mission and befriends Uncle. 

During a tour of one of Uncle's scrapyards, Ryan notices some old equipment with the word "OME" on it. He finds out OME stands for Offshore Marine Exploration, a defunct oil-pump company. They eventually learn of an also defunct company which repaired OME equipment. One of the three employees was murdered in airport hotel rooms near Uncle's scrapyard. They work out the other two were captured by Islamic State so that they could repair oil-pump equipment when it malfunctioned. Islamic State controls several oil wells with OME equipment and they sell the oil for funds. Rescuing the hostages would not only save them but cripple Islamic State's capability to repair their oil wells. 

After James presents the evidence to the Deputy Prime Minister, Defence Minister, a SAS colonel, the heads of MI5 and MI6 and some experts on oil industry and Islamic State, he agrees to form a team to rescue the hostages. Lauren, Kyle and Bruce join him at the summer hostel. Ryan and his friends compete in exercises against James and his team to sharpen him, Lauren, Kyle and Bruce up. Kerry and an Israeli Mossad intelligence officer, Tovah, who will come on the mission, join them. James discovers Bruce and Ning having a relationship. He decides not to expose them, as doing so would cause Ning to be expelled and Bruce to be banned from campus and ruin Bruce's relationship with Ning. 

While training in miniature plane-gliders called microlights, Kerry is seriously injured in a bad crash landing. Ryan jumps at the opportunity to come on the mission. However, because it is not an official CHERUB mission, Ryan couldn't join it because he is a CHERUB agent, but he joins it by quitting CHERUB as he is 17 and close to leaving anyway. 

The team enter Syria through Turkey and make camp in an abandoned shopping precinct. They reach the well and rescue the hostages, then fend off an ambush. A 12-year-old girl named Zahra is among the ambushers but does not take part in the fighting. After her older brother, who is an Islamic State fighter, is killed, the group take her with back home. She is recruited into CHERUB and awaits basic training. Uncle and several of his associates are arrested, Tovah goes back to Israel, Ryan goes to Russia to meet a girl named Natalka he met on a previous mission, Lauren goes back to Texas to her racing driver career with her husband Rat, Bruce returns to Thailand as an instructor of martial arts, but is banned from CHERUB campus for three years and can't apply for a job there. Kyle goes back to his home and job. Kerry rejoins James in mission control. At a reunion, Kerry and James announce that they are "surprised but delighted" to be expecting their first child, to be named John.

References

CHERUB novels
2016 British novels
Hodder & Stoughton books
Novels about terrorism
Novels set in London
Novels set in Birmingham, West Midlands
Novels set in Syria
Novels set in Turkey
British spy novels
British thriller novels
Works about the Syrian civil war